Macedonia selected their Junior Eurovision entry for 2010 through Detska pesna za Eurovizija, a national selection consisting of 5 songs. The winner was Anja Veterova, with the song "Eooo, Eooo".

Anja will compete for Macedonia at the Junior Eurovision Song Contest 2010, to be held on 20 November in Minsk, Belarus.

Before Junior Eurovision

Dečja pesna Eurovizije 
The final took place on 25 September 2010, hosted by Monica Todorovska and Tony Drenkovski. Five songs competed and the winner was be decided by a combination of votes from a jury panel (50%) and televoting (50%).

At Junior Eurovision

Voting

Notes

References

Junior Eurovision Song Contest
Macedonia
2010